The 2016 Utah Utes football team represented the University of Utah during the 2016 NCAA Division I FBS football season. The team was coached by twelfth year head coach Kyle Whittingham and played their home games in Rice-Eccles Stadium in Salt Lake City, Utah. They were members of the South Division of the Pac-12 Conference. They finished the season 9–4, 5–4 in Pac-12 play to finish in third place in the South Division. They were invited to the Foster Farms where they defeated Indiana.

Schedule

Source:

Roster

Rankings

Game summaries

Southern Utah

Sources:

Game Stats: 
Passing: SUU: McCoy Hill 6-12-0--42, Tannon Pedersen 0-6-1--0; Utah: Troy Williams 20-35-0--272, Tyler Huntley 3-4-0--26.
Rushing: SUU: Malik Brown 10-49, Ty Rutledge 1-33, Hill 8-26, Raysean Pringle 5-13, James Felila 3-9, Isaiah Diego-Wi 1-0, Pedersen 4-(-14); Utah: Troy McCormick 12-55, Joe Williams 12-49, Armand Shyne 8-19, T. Williams 5-15.
Receiving: SUU: Mike Sharp 1-14, Steven Wroblews 1-12, Rutledge 1-9, Logan Parker 1-6, Felila 1-4, Pringle 1-(-3); Utah: Tim Patrick 5-105, Rae Singleton 2-56, Troy McCormick 3-55, Tyrone Smith 3-31, Evan Moeai 1-18, Walla Gonzales 1-11, Demari Simpkins 1-8, Siaosi Wilkins 1-8, Terrell Burgess 1-7, Kyle Fulks 2-1, Joe Williams 3-(-2)
Interceptions: Utah: Marcus Williams 1-0.

BYU

Sources:

Game Stats: 
Passing: BYU: Taysom Hill 21-39-3--176, Mitch Juergens 1-1-0--9, Team 0-1-0--0; Utah: Troy Williams 14-23-3--194.
Rushing: BYU: Hill 13-87, Jamaal Williams 12-58, Brayden El-Bakri 1-1, Algernon Brown 1-(-3); Utah: Troy McCormick 10-62, Zack Moss 12-58, Joe Williams 10-26, Troy Williams 7-13, Kyle Fulks 2-11, Team 1-(-1).
Receiving: BYU: Juergens 8-52, Nick Kurtz 3-35, Moroni Laulu-Pututau 3-31, Jonah Trinnaman 2-27, Colby Pearson 2-10, Williams 1-10, Corbin Kaufusi 1-9, Aleva Hifo 1-7, Ului Lapuaho 1-4; Utah: Tyrone Smith 2-60, Tim Patrick 3-59, Rae Singleton 2-23, Evan Moeai 2-21, Harris Handley 2-21, Demari Simpkins 2-6, Joe Williams 1-4.
Interceptions: BYU: Kai Nacua 2-0, Francis Bernard 1-0; Utah: Sunia Tauteoli 2-41, Reginald Porter 1-1.

at San Jose State

USC

at California

Arizona

at Oregon State

at UCLA

Washington

at Arizona State

Oregon

at Colorado

vs. Indiana (Foster Farms Bowl)

References

Utah
Utah Utes football seasons
Redbox Bowl champion seasons
Utah Utes football